White Hall is a historic home located at Princess Anne, Somerset County, Maryland, United States. It is a -story, ell shaped frame house constructed about 1785–1798. The house features a rare mid-19th-century mural painting depicting landscapes and period costumes survives in a second-floor room, a Flemish bond brick gable end wall, and the three-room plan divided by a center hall.

Prior to construction of the home, the land was variously known as Bailey's Good Luck, Austin Adventure, Bellville, the Creek Farm, the Bailey Farm, and in earliest known records, "Taunton Deane." The land was originally granted to Francis Roberts (1636-1703), who arrived there from England. Roberts sold the land to Benjamin Cottman in a documented sale on June 25, 1671.

White Hall was listed on the National Register of Historic Places in 1984.

References

External links

, including photo from 1983, at Maryland Historical Trust

Houses in Somerset County, Maryland
Houses on the National Register of Historic Places in Maryland
Houses completed in 1792
National Register of Historic Places in Somerset County, Maryland